Pihtipudas TV Mast is a mast built in 1952 in Pihtipudas, Finland.

See also
List of tallest structures in Finland

Notes

Towers completed in 1952
Communication towers in Finland
Transmitter sites in Finland
1952 establishments in Finland